The 1979 PBA All-Filipino Conference Finals is the best-of-5 basketball championship series of the 1979 PBA All-Filipino Conference. The Crispa Redmanizers and Toyota Tamaraws battled once again in the finals, this time for the All-Filipino supremacy.

The Crispa Redmanizers won their finals series against the defending champion Toyota Tamaraws, three games to two, to regain the All-Filipino crown.

Qualification

Games summary

The Tamaraws once enjoyed a six-point lead in the third quarter, 75–69, after overhauling a 59–67 deficit.

The Redmanizers lost a 79–72 lead in the third quarter and fell behind by eight points early in the fourth frame, 83–91. 

The Redmanizers appeared headed for an easy win when they led, 98–89, early in the final period. But Toyota’s sensational rookie Arnie Tuadles ignited a searing 18–6 Tamaraw run that wiped out Crispa’s lead and put Toyota on top, 107–104, with 2:37 remaining.

Tuadles tied the game at 109-all before Joy Dionisio scored on a long 25-foot shot that proved to be the winning shot for Crispa, 111–109. 

Robert Jaworski delivered the tie-breaking basket on his own interception while Abe King and Francis Arnaiz combined for three points each in a 7–0 blast in the last two minutes for a winning 113–108 Tamaraw lead.

The Tamaraws last tasted the lead at 107–106 with 3:11 left, but then Freddie Hubalde ignited the breakaway that turned the tide of the game. Atoy Co scored on a three-point play after a miss by Ramon Fernandez to make it 111–107 and after a Toyota timeout, Philip Cezar completed another three-point play on an assist by Gregorio Dionisio for a 114–107 lead with 1:30 to go.

Rosters

Broadcast notes

References

External links
Crispa-Toyota rivalry

Crispa Redmanizers games
Toyota Super Corollas games
1979
1979 PBA season
Crispa–Toyota rivalry
PBA All-Filipino Conference Finals
PBA All-Filipino Conference Finals